Persistence is the retention of plant organs after their normal function has been completed, in contrast with the shedding of deciduous organs after their purpose has been fulfilled. Absence or presence of persistent plant organs can be a helpful clue in plant identification, and may be one of many types of anatomical details noted in the species descriptions or dichotomous keys of plant identification guides. Many species of woody plants with persistent fruit provide an important food source for birds and other wildlife in winter.

Species with persistent parts 

There are numerous herbaceous and woody plant species that produce persistent parts, such as strobili (cones) or fruit. Note that the trait of persistence exhibited by a given species within a genus may not be exhibited by all species within the genus. For example, the Equisetum genus includes some species that have persistent strobili and others that have deciduous strobili.

Persistent strobili 

The following are examples of species with persistent strobili (cones):

 Equisetum arvense (common horsetail)
 Larix occidentalis (western larch)
 Picea mariana (black spruce)
 Pinus banksiana (Jack pine)

Persistent fruit 

The following are examples of species with persistent fruit:

 Aronia arbutifolia  (red chokeberry)
 Berberis thunbergii (Japanese barberry)
 Cornus florida (flowering dogwood)
 Cotoneaster apiculatus (cranberry cotoneaster)
 Crataegus phaenopyrum (Washington hawthorn)
 Malus sargentii (Sargent crabapple)

Image gallery

See also
 Evergreen
 Semi-deciduous
 Marcescence

References

External links 
 Iowa State University Extension: Trees & Shrubs with Colorful (Persistent) Fruit in Fall and Winter

Plant physiology